The Super Soaker 50 was the first Super Soaker water gun, introduced in 1991. It was one of the first pressurized water guns ever made, outselling all of the motorized blasters that had previously dominated the market. Another air pressurized water gun, the Cosmic Liquidator, was made in the late 1970s but it never was popular.

History
In the early 1980s, a rocket scientist named Lonnie Johnson was working on a heat pump system, and was testing it in his bathroom. A powerful stream shot from his prototype, and he immediately realized that this could make a great water gun. Lonnie Johnson spent the next eight years trying to sell his idea. Eventually, Johnson sold the idea to Larami Toys and the concept was designed by William Raucci. They released the Power Drencher. The Power Drencher wasn't very popular at first, but popularity grew significantly when they renamed it the Super Soaker 50.  The name was changed due to copyright issues. Since then, there have been hundreds of other Super Soaker models. These include 10th and 20th anniversary Super Soaker 50s.

References

External links
 Super Soaker 50 history at iSoaker

Water guns